Christopher Monck, 2nd Duke of Albemarle  (14 August 1653 – 6 October 1688) was an English soldier and politician who sat in the House of Commons from 1667 to 1670 when he inherited the Dukedom and sat in the House of Lords.

Origins
Monck was the son and heir of George Monck, 1st Duke of Albemarle (1608–1670) by his wife Anne Clarges (d.1700), a daughter of John Clarges, "Farrier in the Savoy", of Drury Lane, Westminster. Anne's brother was Sir Thomas Clarges (c. 1618–1695), MP, who greatly assisted his brother-in-law, then before his elevation to the dukedom, General George Monck, in bringing about the Restoration of the Monarchy in 1660. She was the presumed widow of Thomas Radford, milliner, of New Exchange, Strand, Westminster, although it was said that her husband was still alive when her son was born. This left a question concerning Monck's legitimacy.

Youth
Monck was educated privately and entered Gray's Inn in 1662. From 1660 until his father's death ten years later in 1670, he was known by the courtesy title of Earl of Torrington, one of his father's subsidiary titles.

Career
At the age of 13, Monck entered politics, having been elected Member of Parliament (MP) for Devon in January 1667. In 1670 he was elevated to the peerage and thus entered the House of Lords, following the death of his father, and thereby also inherited his father's peerage titles. He became a Gentleman of the Bedchamber and inherited his father's great feudal title, Lord of Bowland. He was created a Knight of the Garter, a Privy Councillor and in 1675 Lord Lieutenant of Devon, in which latter role he served for ten years. He became a titular colonel of several horse regiments of the English Army.

In 1673 he raised a regiment as part of the Blackheath Army under Marshal Schomberg. It was intended for service in the Dutch Republic, but was disbanded following the Treaty of Westminster before seeing any action.

From 1682 until his death, Monck was Chancellor of the University of Cambridge. In 1685 he resigned the Lord Lieutenancy of Devon to fight against the Monmouth Rebellion, but was largely unsuccessful as a military leader. In 1686, Monck was a major investor in a treasure-seeking expedition headed by William Phips, who had located the wreck of the Spanish treasure ship Nuestra Señora de la Concepción in February 1687. Phips returned to London with more than £200,000 worth of treasure, of which Monck received a 25 percent share.  After serving in a few more minor positions, in 1687, Monck was appointed Lieutenant Governor of Jamaica.

Boxing pioneer
On 6 January 1681, Monck arranged a boxing match between his butler and his butcher. This was the first recorded boxing match in England. The butcher won the match.

Residences

Potheridge, Devon

His Devonshire seat was Potheridge, 3 miles south-east of Great Torrington, a grand mansion re-built by his father circa 1660 on the site of the former manor house occupied by his family since at the latest 1287. It was mostly demolished after the death of the 2nd duchess in 1734 and the surviving section forms the present Great Potheridge farmhouse, inside which however some remnants of the former mansion remain, including two massive 17th-century classical-style doorcases, a colossal overmantel with carved putti and trophies, and a grand staircase.

Clarendon House, London

In 1675 Monck purchased for £26,000 the very grand London townhouse Clarendon House from the heirs of its builder, Edward Hyde, 1st Earl of Clarendon (1609–1674). In 1683 he resold it to a consortium of investors led by Sir Thomas Bond, who demolished it and built on its site Albemarle Street, Bond Street and Dover Street.

Marriage and succession
At the royal Palace of Whitehall in London on 30 December 1669, shortly before his father's death, Monck married Lady Elizabeth Cavendish (d.1734), eldest daughter and co-heiress of Henry Cavendish, 2nd Duke of Newcastle. She gave birth to a son who died soon after his birth, and Monck left no further surviving children. In 1692 his widow remarried to Ralph Montagu, 1st Duke of Montagu (1638 – c. 1709). She was buried in Westminster Abbey on 11 September 1734.

Death and succession
Monck died in Jamaica on 6 October 1688, age 35. He was buried in Westminster Abbey on 4 July 1689. As the Duke left no children, all his titles became extinct on his death.

References

1653 births
1688 deaths
Governors of Jamaica
British colonial heads of the Bahamas
British Life Guards officers
Chancellors of the University of Cambridge
Christopher
Knights of the Garter
Lord-Lieutenants of Devon
Lord-Lieutenants of Essex
English MPs 1661–1679
Members of the Privy Council of England
Members of Gray's Inn
Monmouth Rebellion
17th-century Jamaican people
Members of the Parliament of England (pre-1707) for Devon
History of boxing